Colonel Sanders (1890–1980) was an American businessman and the founder of Kentucky Fried Chicken.

Colonel Sanders may also refer to:
Addison Hiatt Sanders (1823–1912), a colonel in the Union Army during the American Civil War
John C. C. Sanders (1840–1864), a colonel (and brigadier general) in the Confederate States Army during the American Civil War
William P. Sanders (1833–1863), a colonel in the Union Army during the American Civil War.

See also
Colonel Sandurz, a character in Spaceballs